Taylor Matson (born September 16, 1988) is an American professional ice hockey player currently playing for HV71 in the Swedish Hockey League (SHL). He was drafted 176th overall by Vancouver Canucks in the 2007 NHL Entry Draft. Prior to turning professional, Matson spent four years at the  University of Minnesota and in the American Hockey League (AHL) and ECHL.

Playing career
Matson was a two sport athlete at the Academy of Holy Angels, playing both tennis and ice hockey. In 2005, Matson led his schools hockey team to the 2005 Class AA state hockey championship. Although he was drafted 25th overall in the 2005 United States Hockey League (USHL) Draft by the Sioux Falls Stampede, Matson chose to complete high school before joining the USHL. In varsity tennis, he was named captain his junior and senior year and qualified for the State championship. At the conclusion of the 2006–07 season, Matson was named a finalist for the Minnesota Mr. Hockey award and named a second team all-state. After graduating, Matson joined the Des Moines Buccaneers in the USHL to conclude their 2006–07 season. While playing with the Buccaneers, Matson was drafted in the 6th round of the 2007 NHL Entry Draft by the Vancouver Canucks. That year, Matson signed a Letter of Intent to play NCAA Division 1 ice hockey for the University of Minnesota Golden Gophers in the 2008-09 season.

Collegiate
Matson began his freshman season with the Minnesota Golden Gophers while majoring in Kinesiology. His 2008–09 rookie season with the Gophers was cut short with a knee injury in a 6–3 loss to the Michigan Wolverines in December. He underwent surgery for his knee in December and was projected to miss the remainder of the season.

Matson returned for his sophomore season with Gophers healthy after missing 34 games the previous season. He recorded his first collegiate assist on Mike Hoeffel's goal in the season opener against North Dakota. However, he played a total of 19 games before suffering an ankle injury which cut his season short. He won the teams Most Determined Player award at the conclusion of the season and was named to the WCHA All-Academic team.

However, Matson bounced back for the 2010–2011 season and played in a career high 33 games as a junior. He recorded 10 goals and three assists and won the Mike Crupi Most Determined Player for the second time. His season was once again cut short due to an injury he suffered on March 4 against Bemidji State and Matson was forced to miss both the final game of the regular season and the post season games against Alaska Anchorage. He was also named to the WCHA All-Academic team again at the conclusion of the season.

In his senior year, Matson was named team captain. On March 24, 2012, Matson and the Golden Gophers qualified for the Frozen Four for the first time since 2005 after beating North Dakota. In the 5–2 win, Matson ended a 17-game goal scoring drought. However, the Golden Gophers would lose to the Boston College Eagles in the Frozen Four 6–1 on April 4.

Professional
On April 7, 2012, after graduating from the University of Minnesota, Matson signed an amateur tryout contract (ATO) with the Chicago Wolves of the American Hockey League (AHL). After recording two points in five games, Matson signed a professional contract with the team for the 2012–13 season. Matson made the Chicago Wolves opening night roster for the 2012–13 season.

Matson attended the Iowa Wild training camp prior to the 2013–14 season. On December 27, 2013, after playing in 26 games for the Iowa Wild, he was reassigned to the teams ECHL affiliate, the Orlando Solar Bears. Matson was named the ECHL Rookie of the Month of February after recording 19 points in 12 games. On March 1, 2014, Matson was recalled to the Iowa Wild after being honored as ECHL Player of the Week. He was reassigned to the ECHL on March 12, along with Colton Jobke.

He signed with Rögle BK of the HockeyAllsvenskan in Sweden on July 28, 2014 to compete in the 2014–15 season. In his first season with the team, Matson helped them qualify for the Swedish Hockey League, the top tier league in the country. He signed an extension with the team on April 12, 2017.

Prior to the 2018–19 season, Matson extended his contract with the team and was named an alternate captain alongside Jesper Williamsson and Ted Brithén.

Following his seventh season with Rögle BK, helping the club reach the Le Mat Trophy finals, Matson left as a free agent and signed with newly relegated Allsvenskan club, HV71, on June 2, 2021.

Personal life
Matson was born on September 16, 1988, to parents Scott and Lisa Matson.

Career statistics

Awards and honors

References

External links 

1988 births
American men's ice hockey centers
American men's ice hockey right wingers
Chicago Wolves players
Des Moines Buccaneers players
HV71 players
Ice hockey players from Minnesota
Iowa Wild players
Living people
Minnesota Golden Gophers men's ice hockey players
Orlando Solar Bears (ECHL) players
Rögle BK players
Vancouver Canucks draft picks